Eva Maria "Tjorven" Andersson (born 30 June 1957) is a retired Swedish swimmer who won a bronze medal in the 4 × 100 m freestyle relay at the 1970 European Aquatics Championships. She finished sixth in the same event at the 1972 Summer Olympics.

References

External links

Eva "Tjorven" Andersson. Sveriges Olympiska Kommitté

1957 births
People from Uddevalla Municipality
Swimmers at the 1972 Summer Olympics
Swedish female freestyle swimmers
Olympic swimmers of Sweden
Living people
European Aquatics Championships medalists in swimming
Sportspeople from Västra Götaland County